Pauline Croze is the first album by Pauline Croze, recorded in 2004 and released in February 2005, containing songs by Doriand and by Mickaël Furnon of the group Mickey 3D.

Track listing
"Mise à nu" – 3:29
"Dans la chaleur des nuits de pleine lune" – 2:23
"M'en voulez-vous?" – 3:01
"Jeunesse affamée" – 3:35
"T'es beau" – 2:43
"Quand je suis ivre" – 3:28
"Je suis floue" – 1:52
"Je ferai sans" – 3:18
"Larmes" – 2:36
"Tita" – 3:22
"Femme fossile" – 3:08
"Mal assis" – 5:20

2005 debut albums